DRP may refer to:

Political parties
 Democratic Republican Party (South Korea)
 Deutsche Rechtspartei, a right-wing German party
 Dhivehi Rayyithunge Party, a right-wing Maldivian party

Other uses
 Dells Raceway Park, Wisconsin, US
 Distribution resource planning, for orders in a supply chain
 Disaster recovery plan, for IT infrastructure
 Diabetic retinopathy, a disease of the retina as a complication of diabetes mellitus